Old Aloysius was a camogie club in County Cork. Notable players included Lil Kirby, Peggy Hogg, Kathleen Buckley, Renee Fitzgerald and Mary Moran (both later to become Presidents of the Camogie Association).

Colours
Cork wore the Old Aloysius colours green and grey instead of their red and white tunics in the 1939 All Ireland final to avoid a clash of colours with Galway.

Achievements
 Cork Senior Camogie Championship Winners (16) 1932, 1938, 1939, 1940, 1941, 1943, 1944, 1945, 1946, 1949, 1953, 1955, 1956, 1959, 1960, 1961

References

External links
 Camogie.ie Official Camogie Association Website
 Wikipedia List of Camogie clubs

Camogie clubs in County Cork